The MTV Video Music Award for Best New Artist has been given out since the first annual MTV Video Music Awards in 1984. Until 2006, the award was named Best New Artist in a Video. In 2007 its name was changed to Best New Artist, as the category underwent a format change to recognize the artist's body of work for the full year rather than a specific video. For the 2008 ceremony, the award retained its 2007 name but returned to the format of awarding a specific video rather than the artist's full body of work. The category was later renamed Artist to Watch through 2013 to 2015 while still keeping the format of an award going to a particular video. In 2020, the Best New Artist award merged with the Push Artist of the Year award (2018-2019) to create the Push Best New Artist award.  In 2021, MTV returned the category to its original name (Best New Artist), thus separating it from the MTV Push initiative, which again received its own category (Push Performance of the Year).

Winners and nominees

1980s

1990s

2000s

2010s

2020s

See also 
 Grammy Award for Best New Artist
 MTV Europe Music Award for Best New Act
 MTV Europe Music Award for Best Push Act

Notes

References 

MTV Video Music Awards
Music awards for breakthrough artist
Awards established in 1984